Royal Norman Moore Jr. (born April 15, 1935) is a retired major general in the United States Marine Corps. He was Commander of Fleet Marine Force, Pacific from August 1991 to April 1, 1992. In 1992 after it was discovered that he had previously falsified a NATOPS EA-6B proficiency test by having a junior Officer complete the test for him, and submit it as his own results. He resigned his command after the discovery, which led to a censure by Secretary of the Navy H. Lawrence Garrett III, and his retirement. From 1989 to 1991, he also commanded the 3rd Marine Aircraft Wing during the Persian Gulf War, a war in which he was described as "the nation's top Marine aviator".

References

United States Marine Corps generals
People from Pasadena, California
1935 births
Living people
Recipients of the Legion of Merit
Military personnel from California